Diana Cristiana Axinte (born 16 January 1996) is a Romanian handballer who plays for HC Dunărea Brăila.

References
 

1996 births
Living people
People from Brăila
Romanian female handball players